Alena Sergeyevna Fomina-Klotz (née Fomina; ; born 5 July 1989) is a Russian tennis player. From 2005 to October 2017, she represented Ukraine.

Career
She has won one singles title and 25 doubles titles on the ITF Circuit. On 3 April 2017, she reached a career-high singles ranking of world No. 520. On 30 January 2023, she peaked at No. 113 in the WTA doubles rankings.

Fomina made her WTA Tour debut at the 2014 Topshelf Open, partnering Christina Shakovets in doubles, but lost her first-round match against Maria Kirilenko and Yanina Wickmayer.

WTA 125 tournament finals

Doubles: 1 (runner-up)

ITF Circuit finals

Singles: 3 (1 title, 2 runner-ups)

Doubles: 46 (26 titles, 20 runner-ups)

Notes

References

External links
 
 
 

1989 births
Living people
Sportspeople from Sevastopol
Ukrainian female tennis players
Russian female tennis players
Ukrainian emigrants to Russia
Naturalised citizens of Russia